Otuz-Uul is a village in the Issyk-Kul Region of Kyrgyzstan. Its population was 1,334 in 2021. It is part of the Oktyabr rural community (ayyl aymagy) of the Ak-Suu District.

References 

Populated places in Issyk-Kul Region